Neodymium arsenate, also known as neodymium(III) arsenate, is the arsenate of neodymium with the chemical formula of NdAsO4. In this compound, neodymium exhibits the +3 oxidation state. It has good thermal stability, and its pKsp,c is 21.86±0.11.

Preparation
Neodymium arsenate can be obtained from the reaction between sodium arsenate (Na3AsO4) and neodymium chloride (NdCl3) in solution:
 Na3AsO4 + NdCl3 → 3 NaCl + NdAsO4↓

See also
 Arsenic

References

Neodymium compounds
Arsenates